"Pop!" is a song recorded by South Korean singer Nayeon for her debut extended play, Im Nayeon. It was released as the EP's lead single on June 24, 2022. It is a pop and bubblegum song that features bright beats. Characterized by live instruments, winding high notes, and a variety of ad libs, with lyrics revolving around a protagonist who sings about her ability to capture her lover's heart.

Background and release 
On May 18, 2022, Republic Records announced that Nayeon would be releasing her debut solo EP on June 24, 2022. On May 31, JYP Entertainment released the EP's tracklist, with "Pop!" as the title track. They also released a short snippet of the song. On June 21, the music video teaser was officially released through JYP Entertainment's YouTube channel. On June 24, the song was finally released through all digital platforms.

Composition 
"Pop!" was described as a song that "conjures classic Twice, from the fun bubblegum beat to the addictive melody and cute lyrics". It is a pop and bubblegum song that takes inspiration from the sounds of second-generation bubblegum K-pop. Characterized by bright beats, live instruments such as bass, guitar, and horn, winding high notes, and a variety of ad libs. Its lyrics revolve around "a bold declaration of confidence." Where the protagonist sings about her ability to capture her lover's heart with ease. The lyrics "explored the flirtatious and accrescent sentiments of romance using onomatopoeia to portray popping a lover’s heart like a bubble." In terms of musical notation, the song was written in the key of D major with a tempo of 97 beats per minute.

Promotion 
On June 25, 2022, Nayeon performed the song on MTV's Fresh Out Live Show to promote it.

Critical reception 
Teen Vogue's Lai Frances wrote “Pop!” pays homage to the grandiose sounds and production that embody what K-pop is known for: luxurious music video sets, designer outfits, and a plethora of instruments on top of a catchy hook that revives sounds from second generation K-pop, an era of which she's a fan. She’s inspired by TWICE as she turns herself into a leader, main vocal, main dancer, energy pill, and center visual all in one. With the spotlight already on her side, she’s managed to utilize it as a way to talk casually and let herself be honest about her growth and creativity in music."

Beats Per Minute's Early, JT praised the song's catchy energy and its usage of retro and modern sounds, writing "She sings about her ability to captivate and it’s hard to disagree as the song maintains a fun and relentlessly catchy energy (the recurrent “pop pop pop”s in particular seem designed to take residence in the brain for days after hearing them). The song effectively mixes the retro and the modern where Nayeon sounds entirely at ease. An anthem for being extroverted and having faith in your own capabilities is a welcome change of pace in the pop landscape."

NME's Daly, Rhian described the song as the best track on the album writing, "First, opening the whole show is the title track ‘Pop’ – a confident and assured piece of pop that’s bubblegum bright and just as addictive as blowing bubbles til they burst. Nayeon sounds nothing short of spectacular on the summer-ready single, sunnily warning: “You cannot get away from me / The twitch in your eyes / Your nervous gestures, baby / I want to pop you."

Accolades

Credits and personnel 
Credits adopted from Melon.

Studio
 JYPE Studios – recording 
 Chapel Swing Studios – mixing 
 Sound 360 – mixing & mastering 
 821 Sound Mastering – mastering
Song
 Nayeon – vocals
 Sophia Pae – background vocals
 Isran – lyricist
 Kenzie — composition
 Hayden Chapman — composition
 Greg Bonnick — composition
 Ellen Berg — composition
 LDN Noise — arrangement, all instruments
 Jane Kim – musician 
 Sim Eunji — vocal arrangement, audio engineer
 Hyejin Koo – recording
 Tony Maserati – mixing 
 David K – mixing 
 Younghyun – mixing
 Haneul Lee – mixing engineer
 Jeonghoon – mixing engineer
 Choi Jung-Hoon – mixing engineer
 Choi Dolby – mixing engineer

Charts

Weekly charts

Monthly charts

Year-end charts

Certifications

See also 
 List of Inkigayo Chart winners (2022)
 List of M Countdown Chart winners (2022)
 List of Show! Music Core Chart winners (2022)

References 

2022 debut singles
2022 songs
JYP Entertainment singles
Republic Records singles
Korean-language songs
South Korean pop songs
Bubblegum pop songs
Songs written by Kenzie (songwriter)